Shihlin Electric and Engineering Corporation (SEEC) is a company based in Taipei, Taiwan, which manufactures electrical and power transformers, switchgear, automation, controls and automotive electrical devices. The technology for the manufacturing originally involved technology transfers from Mitsubishi Electric (Japan) and France Transfo, a Schneider Electric Company (France).

Shihlin Electric was founded in 1955. The company is listed on the Taiwan Stock Exchange (TSE 1503), and Mitsubishi Electric (Japan) is a 20% share holder. Shihlin Electric, in Q1 2009, lists 15 sales subsidiaries and over 100 distribution partners worldwide. Additionally, Shihlin Electric operates manufacturing factories in Taiwan (three in Hsinchu), Mainland China (ten in Xiamen, Suzhou, Wuxi, Changzhou, Fuzhou and Wuhan) and Vietnam (one in Southern Vietnam).

See also
 List of companies of Taiwan

1955 establishments in Taiwan
Companies based in Taipei
Electronics companies established in 1955
Electronics companies of Taiwan
Taiwanese brands